Solivella is a municipality in the comarca of the Conca de Barberà in Catalonia, Spain.

Mentioned for the first time in a document from 1058, it rose around a castle, of which today only ruins remain. It was a possession of the Monastery of Santes Creus, and in 1393 it went to the Catalan crown.

The medieval Sanctuary of Tallat is located nearby, between Solivella and Belltall.

References

 Panareda Clopés, Josep Maria; Rios Calvet, Jaume; Rabella Vives, Josep Maria (1989). Guia de Catalunya, Barcelona: Caixa de Catalunya.  (Spanish).  (Catalan).

External links 

Official website 
 Government data pages 

Municipalities in Conca de Barberà